George Gilbert may refer to:

 George B. Gilbert, longtime pastor of Emmanuel Church (Killingworth, Connecticut), author
 George G. Gilbert (1849–1909), U.S. Representative from Kentucky
 George Gilbert (cricketer) (1829–1906), Australian cricketer
 George Gilbert (Jesuit) (1559–1583), English Roman Catholic convert and activist